André Almeida  may refer to:

Andrey Almeida (born 1988), Brazilian football forward
André Almeida (born 1990), Portuguese football defender
André Almeida (cyclist) (born 1992), Brazilian cyclist
André Almeida (footballer, born 1995), Portuguese football defender
André Almeida (footballer, born 2000), Portuguese football midfielder